The 1989 South Carolina Gamecocks football team represented the University of South Carolina as an independent dring the 1989 NCAA Division I-A football season. Led by first-year head coach Sparky Woods, the Gamecocks compiled a record of 6–4–1. South Carolina was invited to the Liberty Bowl, where they lost to Indiana.  The team played home games at Williams–Brice Stadium in Columbia, South Carolina.

Woods succeeded Joe Morrison, who died of a heart attack in February 1989.

Schedule

Roster
Todd Ellis* QB
Dickie DeMasi QB
Ben Hogan QB
Pat Turner QB
Harold Green* RB
Mike Dingle RB
Albert Haynes RB
Ken Watson RB
Keith Bing RB
Kevin Jones RB
Robert Brooks* WR
Eddie Miller* WR
George Rush* WR
Carl Platt WR
David Pitchko WR
Skeets Thomas WR
Bill Zorr WR
Darren Greene WR
David Hodge* TE
Charles Steward TE
Dany Branch* OL
Ike Harris* OL
Kenny Haynes* OL
Curt High* OL
Calvin Stephens* OL
Hal Hamrick OL
Antoine Rivens OL
Marty Dye* DL
Curtis Godwin* DL
Tim High* DL
Corey Miller* DL
Patrick Blackwell DL
Troy Duke DL
Trent Simpson DL
Robert Gibson* LB
Patrick Hinton* LB
David Taylor* LB
Scott Windsor* LB
Mike Conway LB
Joe Reaves LB
Keith Emmons LB
Erik Anderson* DB
Leon Harris* DB
Keith McDonald* DB
Antonio Walker DB
Stephane Williams DB

References

Additional sources
Griffin, J. C. (1992). The first hundred years: A history of south carolina football. Atlanta, GA: Longstreet Press

South Carolina
South Carolina Gamecocks football seasons
South Carolina Gamecocks football